Daniel Dziwniel (born 19 August 1992) is a professional footballer who plays as a left-back for Polish club Górnik Łęczna. Born in Germany, he represented Poland at under-21 international level and holds dual Polish-German citizenship.

Career

Club career
On 25 August 2020, he signed a one-year contract with Sandecja Nowy Sącz.

National team
From 2012 to 2014, he was a part of Poland national under-21 football team.

References

External links
 
 
Daniel Dziwniel w Zagłębiu Lubin, sportowefakty.wp.pl, 13 June 2016

Living people
1992 births
Association football defenders
Footballers from Frankfurt
Polish footballers
German footballers
Poland under-21 international footballers
3. Liga players
Ekstraklasa players
I liga players
Swiss Super League players
Kickers Offenbach players
Ruch Chorzów players
FC St. Gallen players
Zagłębie Lubin players
Korona Kielce players
Sandecja Nowy Sącz players
Górnik Łęczna players
German people of Polish descent
Citizens of Poland through descent
German expatriate footballers
Polish expatriate footballers
Expatriate footballers in Switzerland
German expatriate sportspeople in Switzerland
Polish expatriate sportspeople in Switzerland